Winsor & Newton (also abbreviated W&N) is an English manufacturing company based in London that produces a wide variety of fine art products, including acrylics, oils, watercolour, gouache, brushes, canvases, papers, inks, graphite and coloured pencils, markers, and charcoals.

History 

The company was founded in 1832 by William Winsor and Henry Newton. The firm was originally located at Henry Newton's home in 38 Rathbone Place, London. This was then part of an artists' quarter in which a number of eminent painters, including Constable, had studios, and other colourmen were already established.

The standards of quality for W&N's most renowned line of kolinsky sable brush, the Series 7, began after Queen Victoria ordered it should be "the very finest watercolour brush" in 1866. A few months before his death, Henry Newton sold the business to the newly incorporated firm of "Winsor & Newton Ltd.", which included members of both families amongst the shareholders. In 1937, W&N introduced its gouache paints.

The company moved to Wealdstone in northwest London in 1937. After World War II, W&N opened a brush-making factory in Lowestoft. In 1970, the company introduced its first range of acrylics, and the first artists' alkyd oil colour came six years later. Later, in 1992, a series of oil bars were launched.

The Winsor & Newton student range of watercolours was named after John Sell Cotman.

Products 
Art products made by Winsor & Newton, distinguished by size, series, material and function (e.g. effects or process).

{| class="wikitable sortable" width=750px
! width=150px| Product
! width=600px| Range / brand
|-
| Brushes || Natural hair (kolinsky sable -Series 7, squirrel, hog -Artist's Hog, Azanta, Winton), synthetic fibres (Cotman, Monarch, Artisan, Galeria), natural/synthetic mix (Sceptre)  
|-
| Paints || Oil (Winton, Artist's, Griffin Artisan), acrylic (Galeria, Finity), watercolour (Cotman, Artist's), gouache (Designers), marker pens (Promarker), (Promarker Brush), (Promarker Watercolour), charcoal, graphite and coloured pencils  
|-
| Inks || Drawing and calligraphy inks 
|-
| Papers || Watercolour, oil (Winton), acrylic (Galeria), marker, sketching
|-
| Canvas || Cotton, polycotton
|-
| Accessories || Canvas boards, solvents, masking fluids, varnishes, easels, travel bags, brush holders, stools, instructional books
|}

 In popular culture 

The Winsor & Newton paints are repeatedly referenced in Dorothy Sayers' 1931 detective novel Five Red Herrings, whose plot deals with a painter being murdered and six other painters being suspected of killing him. The painting habits of the suspects, including which kind of paint is used by each, turn out to provide crucial clues that eventually lead Lord Peter Wimsey to the real culprit.

In Michel Bussi's 2011 detective novel Black Waterlilies set in Giverny, "Winsor and Newton" is frequently referenced, although it is imagined to be an American, rather than a British, company.

Karlheinz Stockhausen and his studio assistants read product names from the Winsor & Newton catalogue aloud in his electronic composition Hymnen''.

References

External links

 

Art materials brands
Watercolor brands
Artists' acrylic paint brands
Gouache brands
Ink brands
Companies based in the London Borough of Harrow
British companies established in 1832
British Royal Warrant holders
Oil paint brands
Manufacturing companies based in London
Manufacturing companies established in 1832